This is a list of foreign players in the Saudi Pro League, which commenced play in 2008. The following players must meet both of the following two criteria:
Have played at least one Pro League game. Players who were signed by Pro League clubs, but only played in cup and/or Asian games, or did not play in any competitive games at all, are not included.
Are considered foreign, i.e., outside Saudi Arabia determined by the following:
A player is considered foreign if his allegiance is not to play for the national team of Saudi Arabia.
More specifically,
If a player has been capped on international level, the national team is used; if he has been capped by more than one country, the highest level (or the most recent) team is used.
If a player has not been capped on international level, his country of birth is used, except those who clearly indicated to have switched his nationality to another nation.
Clubs listed are those for which the player has played at least one Pro game — and seasons are those in which the player has played at least one Pro League game. Note that seasons, not calendar years, are used. For example, "2008–11" indicates that the player has played in every season from 2008–09 to 2010–11, but not necessarily every calendar year from 2008 to 2011. Therefore, a player should always have a listing under at least two years — for instance, a player making his debut in 2011, during the 2011–12 season, will have '2011–12' after his name. This follows general practice in expressing sporting seasons in Saudi Arabia.

106 of the 207 foreign FIFA-affiliated nations have been represented in the Pro League.  On 15 September 2022, Mozambique became the most recent country to be represented, with Luís Miquissone making his league debut for Abha against Al-Fayha.

In bold: players who have played at least one Premier League game in the current season (2022–23), and are still at a club for which they have played. This does not include current players of a Pro League club who have not played a Pro League game in the current season.

Details correct as of 4 February 2023

Albania 
Sokol Cikalleshi – Al-Khaleej – 2022–
Gilman Lika – Al-Faisaly – 2013–14
Migen Memelli – Al-Faisaly, Al-Taawoun – 2010–13

Algeria 

Ayoub Abdellaoui – Al-Ettifaq – 2021–22
Najib Ammari – Damac – 2019–20
Malik Asselah – Al-Hazem – 2018–20, 2021–22
Abdelkader Bedrane – Damac – 2022–
Youcef Belaïli – Al-Ahli – 2019–20
Hicham Belkaroui – Al-Raed – 2018–19
Mokhtar Belkhiter – Al-Qadsiah – 2018–19
Sofiane Bendebka – Al-Fateh – 2019–
Djamel Benlamri – Al-Shabab, Al-Khaleej – 2016–20, 2022–23
Mohamed Benyettou – Al-Shabab – 2016–18
Saïd Bouchouk – Al-Qadsiah – 2011–12
Hadj Bouguèche – Al-Qadsiah, Al-Nassr, Al-Taawoun – 2011–13
Salim Boukhanchouche – Abha – 2019–20
Mohamed Boulaouidet – Ohod – 2017–18
Ramzi Bourakba – Najran – 2011–12
Farouk Chafaï – Damac – 2019–
Farid Cheklam – Najran – 2011–15
Ibrahim Chenihi – Al-Fateh, Damac – 2018–21
Mourad Delhoum – Al-Nassr – 2013–14
Abdelmoumene Djabou – Al-Nassr – 2017–18
Reda Benhadj Djillali – Najran – 2011–12
Azzedine Doukha – Ohod, Al-Raed – 2017–21
Abdelaziz Guechi – Al-Adalah – 2019–20
Ryad Kenniche – Al-Qadsiah – 2017–18
Nacereddine Khoualed – Ohod – 2017–18
Raïs M'Bolhi – Al-Ettifaq – 2017–22
Adel Maïza – Al-Ahli – 2008–09
Zidane Mebarakou – Al-Wehda – 2018–19
Carl Medjani – Ohod – 2018–19
Farid Mellouli – Al-Qadsiah – 2015–16
Tayeb Meziani – Abha – 2021–
Mohamed Naâmani – Al-Fateh – 2018–19
Chamseddine Rahmani – Damac – 2019–20
Youcef Saïbi – Al-Ahli – 2008–09
Amir Sayoud – Al-Tai – 2021–
Hillal Soudani – Al-Fateh, Damac – 2020–
Mehdi Tahrat – Abha – 2019–21
Saphir Taïder – Al-Ain – 2020–21
Antar Yahia – Al-Nassr – 2011–12
Moustapha Zeghba – Al-Wehda, Damac – 2019–
Abdelmalek Ziaya – Al-Ittihad – 2010–12

Angola 
Fábio Abreu – Al-Batin – 2020–22
Valdo Alhinho – Al-Batin – 2017–18
Flávio Amado – Al-Shabab – 2009–11
Bastos – Al-Ain – 2020–21
Hélder Costa – Al-Ittihad – 2022–

Argentina 

Éver Banega – Al-Shabab – 2020–
Gonzalo Cabrera – Al-Faisaly – 2016–18
Ezequiel Cerutti – Al-Hilal – 2018–19
Tobías Figueroa – Al-Tai – 2021–22
Víctor Figueroa – Al-Nassr – 2009–11
Ramiro Funes Mori – Al-Nassr – 2021–22
Rubén Gigena – Al-Qadsiah – 2009–10
Leonardo Gil – Al-Ittihad – 2019–20
Jonathan Gómez – Al-Fayha – 2017–19
Cristian Guanca – Al-Ettifaq, Al-Shabab – 2018–21, 2022–
Luciano Leguizamón – Al-Ittihad – 2009–10
Cristian Lema – Damac – 2020–21
Damián Manso – Al-Nassr – 2012–13
Pity Martínez – Al-Nassr – 2020–
Juan Mercier – Al-Nassr – 2011–12
Diego Morales – Al-Ahli – 2012–13
Lautaro Palacios – Al-Adalah – 2022–23
Agustín Rossi – Al-Nassr – 2022–
Sebastián Rusculleda – Al-Ahli – 2009–10
Rodrigo Salinas – Al-Ettifaq – 2017–18
Javier Toledo – Al-Ahli – 2009–10
Emiliano Vecchio – Al-Ittihad – 2019–20
Luciano Vietto – Al-Hilal, Al-Shabab – 2020–
Sergio Vittor – Damac – 2019–22
Emilio Zelaya – Damac – 2019–22

Armenia 
Marcos Pizzelli – Al-Raed, Al-Shabab – 2015–16, 2017–18

Australia 

Martin Boyle – Al-Faisaly – 2021–22
Miloš Degenek – Al-Hilal – 2018–19
Mitchell Duke – Al-Taawoun – 2020–21
Jack Duncan – Al-Qadsiah – 2018–19
Craig Goodwin – Al-Wehda, Abha – 2019–21
Adam Griffiths – Al-Shabab – 2009–10
Brad Jones – Al-Nassr – 2018–21
Matthew Jurman – Al-Ittihad – 2018–19
Osama Malik – Al-Batin – 2018–19
Jonathan McKain – Al-Nassr – 2010–11
Mark Milligan – Al-Ahli – 2017–18
Dimitri Petratos – Al-Wehda – 2020–21
James Troisi – Al-Ittihad – 2015–16
Rhys Williams – Al-Qadsiah – 2018–19, 2020–21

Bahrain 
Saleh Abdulhameed – Al-Raed – 2008–09
Ismail Abdullatif – Al-Nahda – 2013–14
Abdulwahab Al-Safi – Al-Qadsiah – 2011–12
Hussain Baba – Al-Shabab, Al-Wehda, Al-Fateh – 2009–11, 2014–15
Abdulla Fatadi – Al-Qadsiah, Al-Shoulla – 2010–11, 2012–13
Mohamed Hubail – Al-Qadsiah – 2009–10
Mohamed Husain – Al-Nassr – 2012–16
Abdullah Omar – Al-Ittihad – 2011–12

Belarus 
Nikita Korzun – Al-Fateh – 2018–19

Belgium 
Yassine El Ghanassy – Al-Raed – 2018–19
Ilombe Mboyo – Al-Raed – 2018–19

Benin 
Khaled Adénon – Al-Wehda – 2019–20
Razak Omotoyossi – Al-Nassr – 2008–09

Bolivia 
Gilbert Álvarez – Al-Hazem – 2018–19
Jhasmani Campos – Al-Orobah – 2014–15
Yasmani Duk – Al-Ettifaq – 2016–17
Gualberto Mojica – Hajer – 2015–16
Ronald Raldes – Al-Hilal – 2008–09

Bosnia and Herzegovina 
Elvis Sarić – Al-Ahli – 2019–21
Asim Šehić – Al-Faisaly – 2011–12
Enes Sipović – Ohod – 2018–19
Benjamin Tatar – Abha – 2020–21
Ervin Zukanović – Al-Ahli – 2019–20

Brazil 

Adriano Alves – Najran, Al-Raed – 2015–17
Aílton – Al-Hilal – 2015–16
Alemão Berger – Al-Faisaly – 2016–17
Alemão Fagner – Al-Hazem – 2018–20
Alison – Al-Hazem – 2021–22
Aloísio – Hajer – 2014–15
Daniel Amora – Al-Raed – 2016–19
Anderson Oliveira – Hajer – 2015–16
Andrezinho – Al-Shoulla – 2014–15
Anselmo – Al-Wehda, Al-Nassr – 2018–
Maurício Antônio – Al-Batin – 2021–
Apodi – Ohod – 2018–19
Arthur Caíke – Al-Shabab – 2018–19
Rafael Assis – Al-Fayha – 2019–20
Filipe Augusto – Damac – 2021–22
Fernando Baiano – Al-Ittihad – 2013–14
Baraka – Al-Batin – 2018–19
Jonatas Belusso – Al-Shabab – 2017–18
Bill – Al-Ittihad – 2012–13
Bismark – Najran, Al-Qadsiah – 2015–19
Léo Bonatini – Al-Hilal – 2016–17
Leandro Bonfim – Al-Ittihad – 2013–14
Ricardo Bóvio – Al-Shabab – 2008–09
Victor Braga – Al-Tai – 2022–
Bruno Luiz – Al-Raed – 2009–10
Bruno Michel – Ohod – 2018–19
Jonathan Cafú – Al-Hazem – 2019–20
Marcelo Camacho – Al-Shabab, Al-Ahli – 2008–13
Camilo – Al-Shabab – 2015–16
Carlos Eduardo – Al-Hilal, Al-Ahli – 2015–20, 2021–22
Carlos Júnior – Al-Shabab – 2021–
Carlos Santos – Al-Ettifaq – 2011–13
Cássio Anjos – Al-Taawoun – 2018–22
Cássio Vargas – Al-Ettifaq – 2012–13
Bruno César – Al-Ahli – 2012–15
Charles – Al-Raed – 2010–12
Claudemir – Al-Ahli – 2017–18
Clayson – Al-Faisaly – 2021–22
Jhon Cley – Al-Qadsiah – 2015–16
Igor Coronado – Al-Ittihad – 2021–
Crysan – Al-Batin – 2018–19
Dankler – Al-Ahli – 2021–22
Dener – Al-Tai – 2021–
Denílson – Al-Faisaly – 2018–19
Diego Maurício – Al-Qadsiah – 2015–16
Diego Souza – Al-Ittihad – 2012–13
Digão – Al-Hilal – 2013–16
Bruno Duarte – Damac – 2022–
Dudu – Ohod – 2017–18
Éder Gaúcho – Al-Nassr – 2008–10
Edson – Al-Qadsiah, Al-Adalah – 2020–21, 2022–
Eduardo Henrique – Al-Raed – 2021–22
Eli Felton – Al-Wehda – 2009–10
Eli Sabiá – Al-Raed – 2017–18
Elias – Al-Fateh – 2014–15
Élton Brandão – Al-Nassr – 2013–14
Élton José – Al-Nassr, Al-Fateh, Al-Qadsiah, Al-Wehda – 2008–09, 2011–20
Euller – Al-Shabab – 2018–19
Everaldo – Al-Faisaly – 2016–17
Everton – Al-Nassr – 2013–14
Evson Patrício – Al-Faisaly – 2017–18
Adriano Facchini – Al-Batin – 2018–19
Farley – Al-Ettifaq – 2018–19
Felipe – Al-Raed, Al-Wehda – 2008–11
Jorge Fellipe – Damac – 2019–20
Fernandão – Al-Wehda – 2018–19
Fernando Andrade – Al-Fayha – 2021–22
Fernando Gabriel – Al-Faisaly – 2015–16
Flávio – Al-Taawoun – 2022–
Douglas Friedrich – Al-Khaleej – 2022–
Marquinhos Gabriel – Al-Nassr – 2014–16
Getterson – Al-Ain – 2020–21
Gilmar – Al-Raed – 2016–17
Giuliano – Al-Nassr – 2018–20
Marcelo Grohe – Al-Ittihad – 2019–
Guilherme Augusto – Al-Faisaly – 2019–22
Guilherme Schettine – Al-Batin – 2017–18
Marcos Guilherme – Al-Wehda – 2018–20
Luiz Gustavo – Al-Nassr – 2022–
Harison – Al-Ahli, Al-Wehda – 2008–09
Heberty – Al-Shabab – 2016–17
Bruno Henrique – Al-Ittihad – 2020–
Hernane – Al-Nassr – 2014–15
Ismael – Al-Faisaly – 2021–22
Iury – Al-Fayha – 2018–19
Jandson – Najran, Al-Qadsiah, Al-Khaleej – 2013–17
Jhonnattann – Al-Batin, Al-Taawoun – 2016–19
Jildemar – Hajer – 2014–15
João Gabriel – Al-Batin – 2018–19
João Guilherme – Al-Fateh – 2016–17
João Pedro – Al-Fateh – 2017–19
Jóbson – Al-Ittihad – 2013–14
Jonas – Al-Ittihad – 2018–20
Jorge Santos – Al-Batin, Al-Qadsiah – 2016–19
Jorginho – Al-Qadsiah – 2017–19
Josimar Roberto – Al-Fateh – 2015–16
Josimar Tavares – Al-Watani – 2008–09
Kanu – Al-Raed – 2018–19
Bruno Lazaroni – Al-Ettifaq – 2010–12
Leandrinho – Al-Raed – 2011–12
Leo Alves – Al-Ettifaq – 2016–17
Leonardo Pereira – Al-Nassr – 2017–18
Leonardo Souza – Al-Ahli – 2017–18
Bruno Lopes – Hajer – 2015–16
Ramon Lopes – Al-Fayha – 2021–22
Lucas Araujo – Al-Tai – 2021–22
Lucas Lima – Al-Ahli – 2019–21
Lucas Tagliapietra – Al-Batin – 2018–19
Luisinho – Al-Faisaly, Al-Wehda – 2016–21
Luiz Antônio – Al-Shabab – 2018–19
Luíz Carlos – Al-Ahli – 2016–17
Luiz Paulo – Al-Batin – 2017–18
Gilberto Macena – Al-Qadsiah – 2015–16
Maicon – Al-Nassr – 2018–21
Mailson – Al-Taawoun – 2022–
Marcelo Ferreira – Al-Tai – 2021–22
Marcelo Tavares – Al-Shabab – 2010–12
Marcinho – Al-Ahli – 2009–11
Mário Sérgio – Al-Raed – 2009–10
Marquinho – Al-Ittihad, Al-Ahli – 2014–16
Mateus Barbosa – Al-Ettifaq – 2010–11
Matheus Gaúcho – Najran – 2013–14
Fernando Menegazzo – Al-Shabab – 2011–14
Michael – Al-Hilal – 2021–
Juliano Mineiro – Najran – 2010–11
Danny Morais – Al-Ettifaq – 2013–14
Morato – Al-Khaleej – 2022–
Bruno Moreno – Al-Raed – 2013–14
Mossoró – Al-Ahli – 2013–14
Muralha – Al-Hazem – 2018–20
Naldo Oliveira – Al-Fayha – 2018–19
Naldo Pereira – Al-Taawoun – 2022–
Nathan Júnior – Al-Fateh – 2016–17
Nei – Al-Shabab – 2008–09
Neris – Al-Hazem – 2021–22
Ângelo Neto – Al-Fayha – 2019–20
Thiago Neves – Al-Hilal – 2009–11, 2013–15
Marcelo Nicácio – Al-Faisaly – 2013–14
Nildo Petrolina – Al-Taawoun – 2018–20
Nino – Al-Batin – 2016–17
Leandro Oliveira – Al-Faisaly – 2013–14
Orestes – Al-Shoulla – 2014–15
Osvaldo – Al-Ahli – 2014–15
Ozéia – Al-Hilal – 2012–13
Adriano Pardal – Al-Faisaly – 2014–16
Paulinho Bezerra – Al-Ahli – 2021–22
Paulinho de Paula – Al-Shabab, Al-Fayha – 2021–
Paulo Sérgio Gomes – Al-Ettifaq – 2008–09
Paulo Sérgio Luiz – Al-Qadsiah – 2017–18
Eric Pereira – Al-Ahli, Najran – 2013–14, 2015–16
Matheus Pereira – Al-Hilal – 2021–23
Pedro Henrique – Al-Wehda – 2020–21
Petros – Al-Nassr, Al-Fateh – 2018–
Rafael Barbosa – Hajer – 2011–12
Rafael Barreto – Al-Wehda – 2016–17
Rafael Bastos – Al-Nassr – 2012–14
Rafael Costa – Damac – 2019–20
Rafinha – Al-Shabab – 2013–16
Reinaldo Mineiro – Al-Raed – 2011–12
Reinaldo da Silva – Al-Faisaly – 2014–15
Renato Cajá – Al-Ittihad – 2008–09
Renato Chaves – Al-Wehda, Al-Batin – 2018–22
Ribamar – Ohod – 2018–19
Ricardo Ryller – Al-Fayha – 2021–
Rico – Hajer – 2011–12
Rodolfo – Al-Hazem – 2018–19
Rogerinho – Al-Shabab, Al-Faisaly, Al-Ettifaq – 2013–14, 2017–20
Romarinho – Al-Ittihad – 2018–
Ronaldo – Ohod – 2017–18
Igor Rossi – Al-Faisaly – 2016–22
Rossi Pereira – Al-Faisaly – 2021–22
Rubinho – Al-Qadsiah – 2015–16
Sandro Manoel – Al-Taawoun, Al-Fateh – 2015–22
Aderlan Santos – Al-Ahli – 2018–19
Iago Santos – Al-Taawoun, Al-Shabab – 2020–
Pablo Santos – Al-Raed – 2022–
René Santos – Al-Raed – 2021–23
Sebá – Al-Shabab – 2018–22
Sérgio Ricardo – Al-Raed – 2009–10
Leandro Sena – Al-Raed – 2008–09
Raphael Silva – Al-Faisaly – 2019–22
Renan Silva – Al-Nahda – 2013–14
Victor Simões – Al-Ahli – 2009–14
Somália – Al-Shabab – 2018–20
Elierce Souza – Al-Ettifaq – 2019–22
Josef Souza – Al-Ahli – 2018–20
Lucas Souza – Al-Khaleej – 2022–
Talisca – Al-Nassr – 2021–
Tarabai – Al-Batin, Al-Raed – 2016–19
Tatá – Al-Ansar – 2011–12
Thiago Carleto – Al-Ittihad – 2018–19
Thiago Gomes – Al-Wehda – 2012–13
Tiago Alves – Al-Hilal – 2016–17
Tiago Bezerra – Al-Qadsiah – 2016–17
Tinga – Al-Batin – 2017–18
Tozin – Najran – 2015–16
Bruno Uvini – Al-Nassr, Al-Ittihad – 2016–21
Valdívia – Al-Ittihad – 2018–19
Paulo Victor – Al-Ettifaq – 2022–
Vinícius Reche – Al-Nassr, Al-Wehda, Al-Taawoun – 2011–14
Vinícius da Silva – Najran – 2008–09
Vitinho – Al-Ettifaq – 2022–
Vitor Júnior – Al-Qadsiah – 2015–16
Wagner Querino – Al-Nassr – 2011–12
Wander Luiz – Al-Raed – 2016–18
Wánderson – Al-Ahli – 2010–11
Wendel – Al-Ittihad, Al-Shabab – 2011–12
Wesley – Al-Hilal – 2012–13
William Alves Conserva – Al-Batin – 2016–17
William Alves Oliveira – Al-Faisaly – 2019–20
Wilson Antônio – Najran – 2008–09
Xuxa – Al-Raed – 2012–13
Júnior Xuxa – Al-Ettifaq – 2012–13
Yago Santos – Al-Qadsiah – 2018–19
Zé Eduardo – Al-Faisaly – 2017–18

Bulgaria 
Martin Lukov – Al-Tai – 2021–22

Burkina Faso 
Haron Eisa – Ohod – 2018–19
Boubacar Kébé – Al-Raed – 2015–16
Mohamed Koffi – Al-Ettifaq – 2016–17
Michaïlou Dramé – Najran – 2014–15
Moussa Yedan – Al-Orobah – 2014–15

Burundi 
Cédric Amissi – Al-Taawoun – 2017–22

Cameroon 
Vincent Aboubakar – Al-Nassr – 2021–23
Paul Alo'o – Al-Taawoun – 2013–16
Jean Bapidi – Al-Orobah – 2013–14
Aminou Bouba – Al-Khaleej, Al-Ettifaq – 2014–17
Arnaud Djoum – Al-Raed – 2019–21
Charles Edoa – Al-Orobah – 2013–14
Achille Emaná – Al-Hilal – 2011–12
Alexis Enam – Al-Raed – 2013–15
Devis Epassy – Abha – 2022–
Collins Fai – Al-Tai – 2021–
Franck Kom – Al-Ahli – 2021–22
Modeste M'bami – Al-Ittihad – 2012–13
John Mary – Al-Shabab – 2021–22
Moustapha Moctar – Hajer – 2011–13
André Ndame Ndame – Al-Faisaly, Hajer – 2014–16
Ernest Nfor – Al-Wehda – 2015–16
Aboubakar Oumarou – Al-Qadsiah – 2018–19
Léandre Tawamba – Al-Taawoun – 2018–
Adolphe Teikeu – Ohod – 2018–19

Cape Verde 
Djaniny – Al-Ahli – 2018–20
Gegé – Al-Fayha – 2017–20
Héldon – Al-Taawoun – 2018–20
Garry Rodrigues – Al-Ittihad – 2018–19, 2020–22
Júlio Tavares – Al-Faisaly, Al-Raed – 2020–
Zé Luís – Al-Taawoun – 2021–22

Central African Republic 
Eudes Dagoulou – Al-Wehda – 2016–17
Vianney Mabidé – Al-Taawoun – 2011–12
Cédric Yambéré – Al-Ettifaq – 2019–20

Chad 
Othman Alhaj – Al-Ahli, Al-Fayha – 2018–21
Maher Sharoma – Al-Adalah, Al-Ettifaq – 2019–20

Chile 

Claudio Baeza – Al-Ahli – 2018–19
Paulo Díaz – Al-Ahli – 2018–19
Ronnie Fernández – Al-Fayha, Al-Raed – 2017–21
Luis Jiménez – Al-Ittihad – 2019–20
Igor Lichnovsky – Al-Shabab – 2020–22
Sebastián Ubilla – Al-Shabab – 2017–18
Carlos Villanueva – Al-Ittihad, Al-Fayha – 2016–20

Colombia 
Johan Arango – Al-Batin – 2018–19
Danilo Asprilla – Al-Fayha, Al-Shabab, Al-Qadsiah – 2017–21
Gustavo Bolívar – Al-Hilal – 2012–13
Cristian Bonilla – Al-Fayha – 2018–19
Diego Caicedo – Al-Faisaly – 2018–19
Gustavo Cuéllar – Al-Hilal – 2019–
Reinaldo Lenis – Al-Adalah – 2022–
Josimar Mosquera – Al-Ahli – 2009–10
David Ospina – Al-Nassr – 2022–23
Jhon Pajoy – Al-Hazem – 2018–19
Ezequiel Palomeque – Al-Raed – 2019–20
Jairo Palomino – Al-Ahli – 2011–13, 2014–15
Sebastian Pedroza – Al-Batin – 2022–
Marco Pérez – Al-Raed – 2019–20
Juan Pablo Pino – Al-Nassr – 2011–12
Anderson Plata – Al-Adalah – 2022–23
Brayan Riascos – Al-Khaleej – 2022–23
Misael Riascos – Al-Batin – 2018–19
Andrés Felipe Roa – Al-Batin – 2022–
Macnelly Torres – Al-Shabab – 2013–14

Comoros 
Kassim Abdallah – Al-Raed – 2017–18

Congo 
Guy Mbenza – Al-Tai – 2022–
Prestige Mboungou – Abha – 2021–23
Fabrice Ondama – Al-Ittihad – 2011–12

Costa Rica 
Óscar Duarte – Al-Wehda – 2022–
John Jairo Ruiz – Al-Fayha – 2017–19

Croatia 
Domagoj Antolić – Damac – 2020–
Leon Benko – Al-Faisaly – 2011–12
Filip Bradarić – Al-Ain, Al-Ahli – 2020–22
Mijo Caktaš – Damac – 2021–22
Damjan Đoković – Al-Raed – 2022–
Dario Jertec – Al-Faisaly, Al-Taawoun, Hajer – 2010–13, 2014–15
Martin Maloča – Al-Faisaly – 2016–17
Pero Pejić – Al-Faisaly – 2011–12
Ante Puljić – Al-Faisaly – 2018–19
Ivan Santini – Al-Fateh – 2021–22
Ahmad Sharbini – Al-Wehda – 2012–13
Anas Sharbini – Al-Ittihad – 2012–13
Marin Tomasov – Al-Nassr – 2016–17
Ivan Tomečak – Al-Nassr – 2016–17

Curaçao 
Until 2010  Netherlands Antilles
Roly Bonevacia – Al-Faisaly – 2019–20

Denmark 
Bashkim Kadrii – Al-Fateh – 2019–20

DR Congo 
André Bukia – Al-Batin – 2022–
Yves Diba Ilunga – Najran, Al-Raed – 2009–13
Doris Fuakumputu – Al-Fateh – 2010–15
Junior Kabananga – Al-Nassr – 2017–18
Kabongo Kasongo – Al-Wehda – 2018–19
Christian Luyindama – Al-Taawoun – 2021–22
Marcel Tisserand – Al-Ettifaq – 2022–
Nzuzi Toko – Al-Fateh – 2018–19

Ecuador 
Jaime Ayoví – Al-Nassr – 2012–13
Felipe Caicedo – Abha – 2022–
Segundo Castillo – Al-Hilal – 2013–14
Carlos Feraud – Al-Hazem – 2018–19
Armando Wila – Al-Nassr – 2014–15

Egypt 

Hosny Abd Rabo – Al-Ittihad, Al-Nassr – 2011–13
Ayman Abdel-Aziz – Hajer – 2012–13
Mohamed Abdel Shafy – Al-Ahli, Al-Fateh – 2014–19
Ahmed Ali – Al-Hilal – 2010–11
Mohamed Atwa – Al-Raed – 2017–19
Mohamed Awad – Al-Wehda – 2018–19
Amir Azmy – Al-Taawoun – 2010–11
Ahmed Bakry – Hajer – 2012–13
Amr Barakat – Al-Shabab – 2017–18
Ahmed El Geaidy – Al-Fateh – 2021–22
Essam El Hadary – Al-Taawoun – 2017–18
Abdallah El Said – Al-Ahli – 2018–19
Hussein El Sayed – Al-Ettifaq – 2017–19
Ahmed El Sheikh – Al-Ettifaq – 2017–18
Mostafa Fathi – Al-Taawoun – 2017–18, 2021–22
Mohammad Fouad – Al-Ain – 2020–21
Hossam Ghaly – Al-Nassr – 2008–10, 2017–18
Ahmed Gomaa – Ohod – 2018–19
Saleh Gomaa – Al-Faisaly – 2017–18
Tarek Hamed – Al-Ittihad – 2022–
Ahmed Hamoudi – Al-Batin – 2016–17
Sherif Hazem – Al-Wehda – 2016–17
Ahmed Hegazi – Al-Ittihad – 2020–
Kahraba – Al-Ittihad – 2016–18
Ahmed Magdy – Al-Wehda – 2016–17
Ahmed Mostafa – Abha, Al-Adalah – 2019–20
Emad Moteab – Al-Ittihad, Al-Taawoun – 2008–09, 2017–18
Ibrahim Salah – Al-Orobah – 2013–14
Shikabala – Al-Raed – 2017–18
Walid Soliman – Al-Ahli – 2008–09
Moamen Zakaria – Al-Ahli – 2017–18

Equatorial Guinea 
Javier Balboa – Al-Faisaly – 2015–16

Eritrea 
Ahmed Abdu Jaber – Al-Wehda, Al-Shabab – 2018–21, 2022–

Estonia 
Karol Mets – Al-Ettifaq – 2020–21

France 

Kodjo Afanou – Al-Hazem – 2008–09
Romain Amalfitano – Al-Faisaly – 2020–22
Jean-David Beauguel – Al-Wehda – 2022–
Tristan Dingomé – Al-Fateh – 2022–
Bafétimbi Gomis – Al-Hilal – 2018–22
Cédric Kisamba – Najran – 2009–10
Alassane N'Diaye – Al-Taawoun – 2016–17
Youssouf Niakaté – Al-Wehda, Al-Ittihad, Al-Ettifaq – 2019–
Thibault Peyre – Al-Batin – 2022–
Abdulfatah Safi – Najran – 2008–09
Mamadou Wagué – Najran – 2015–16
Karim Yoda – Al-Hazem, Al-Wehda – 2019–20, 2022–

Gabon 
Medwin Biteghé – Al-Adalah – 2019–20
André Biyogo Poko – Al-Khaleej – 2022–
Aaron Boupendza – Al-Shabab – 2022–

Gambia 
Bubacarr Trawally – Al-Shabab – 2018–19

Georgia 
Zurab Tsiskaridze – Al-Hazem – 2018–19

Germany 
Marko Marin – Al-Ahli, Al-Raed – 2019–21
Amin Younes – Al-Ettifaq – 2021–22

Ghana 

Afriyie Acquah – Al-Batin – 2021–22
Ahmed Adams – Al-Shoulla – 2014–15
Sadick Adams – Al-Ansar, Al-Nahda – 2011–12, 2013–14
John Antwi – Al-Shabab – 2014–15
Ernest Asante – Al-Hazem – 2019–20
Christian Atsu – Al-Raed – 2021–22
Godwin Attram – Hajer – 2012–13
Mohamed Awal – Al-Shabab – 2014–15
Emmanuel Banahene – Al-Orobah – 2014–15
Philip Boampong – Al-Shoulla – 2012–13
John Boye – Al-Fayha – 2021–22
Sadat Bukari – Al-Shoulla – 2014–15
Winful Cobbinah – Najran – 2014–16
Mohammed Fatau – Al-Qadsiah – 2017–18
Abraham Frimpong – Al-Ain – 2020–21
Torric Jebrin – Al-Wehda – 2016–17
Abraham Kumedor – Al-Fateh – 2014–15
Salifu Mudasiru – Al-Batin – 2022–
Sulley Muntari – Al-Ittihad – 2015–16
Moussa Narry – Al-Orobah – 2014–15
Carlos Ohene – Ohod – 2018–19
Issac Osae – Al-Orobah – 2014–15
Samuel Owusu – Al-Shoulla – 2014–15
Samuel Kwame Owusu – Al-Fayha, Al-Ahli – 2019–22
Prince Tagoe – Al-Ettifaq – 2008–09, 2012–13
William Tiero – Al-Qadsiah – 2011–12
Isaac Vorsah – Ohod – 2017–18
Seidu Yahaya – Al-Fayha – 2018–19

Greece 

Angelos Charisteas – Al-Nassr – 2012–13
Giannis Fetfatzidis – Al-Ahli – 2015–18
Savvas Gentsoglou – Al-Adalah – 2019–20
Kyriakos Papadopoulos – Al-Fayha – 2021–22
Georgios Samaras – Al-Hilal – 2014–15
Panagiotis Tachtsidis – Al-Fayha – 2021–23
Alexandros Tziolis – Al-Fayha – 2017–19

Guinea
Mamadou Ba Camara – Al-Watani – 2008–09
Thierno Bah – Al-Taawoun – 2012–13
Alkhaly Bangoura – Al-Fateh – 2018–19
Ismaël Bangoura – Al-Raed, Al-Batin – 2015–19
Mousa Conde – Al-Watani – 2008–09
Mikael Dyrestam – Al-Adalah – 2022–23
Pascal Feindouno – Al-Nassr – 2009–10
Boubacar Fofana – Al-Ettifaq, Al-Khaleej – 2016–17
Ibrahim Kamara – Najran – 2009–10
Alhassane Keita – Al-Shabab – 2010–11
Naby Soumah – Al-Faisaly, Hajer – 2012–13, 2014–15
Aboubacar Sylla – Al-Khaleej – 2015–16
Ibrahim Yattara – Al-Shabab – 2011–12
Kamil Zayatte – Al-Raed – 2015–16

Guinea-Bissau 
Abel Camará – Al-Faisaly – 2015–16
Alfa Semedo – Al-Tai – 2022–
Zezinho – Damac – 2019–20

Honduras 
Emilio Izaguirre – Al-Fayha – 2017–18
Alexander López – Al-Khaleej – 2016–17

Hungary 
György Sándor – Al-Ittihad – 2012–13

Iraq 
Saad Abdul-Amir – Al-Qadsiah, Al-Ahli, Al-Shabab – 2015–18
Marwan Hussein – Al-Khaleej – 2015–16
Ahmad Ibrahim – Al-Ettifaq – 2017–18
Younis Mahmoud – Al-Ahli – 2013–14
Alaa Mhawi – Al-Batin – 2017–18
Saad Natiq – Abha – 2022–
Amjad Radhi – Al-Raed – 2014–16
Saif Salman – Al-Ittihad, Hajer – 2014–16
Salam Shaker – Al-Fateh – 2015–16

Italy 

Sebastian Giovinco – Al-Hilal – 2018–21

Ivory Coast 
Arnauld Anasse – Al-Faisaly – 2014–15
Ousmane Bamba – Al-Taawoun – 2010–11
Wilfried Bony – Al-Ittihad – 2019–20
Issoumaila Dao – Al-Raed – 2013–14
Patrick Gbala – Al-Fateh – 2015–17
Hervé Guy – Al-Qadsiah – 2017–19
Boris Kabi – Al-Raed – 2008–09
Abdoulaye Koffi – Al-Khaleej – 2015–16
Ghislain Konan – Al-Nassr – 2022–
Oussou Konan – Hajer – 2012–13
Aubin Kouakou – Damac – 2019–20
Habib Meïté – Al-Nahda, Al-Khaleej – 2013–15
Sékou Sanogo – Al-Ittihad – 2018–19
Didier Ya Konan – Al-Ittihad – 2014–15

Jordan 
Baha' Abdel-Rahman – Al-Ahli – 2008–09
Shadi Abu Hash'hash – Al-Taawoun, Al-Fateh – 2010–15
Shareef Adnan – Al-Khaleej – 2014–15
Muath Afaneh – Abha – 2019–22
Yaseen Al-Bakhit – Al-Taawoun, Al-Faisaly, Al-Ettifaq, Al-Shoulla – 2011–15
Mohammad Al-Basha – Al-Taawoun – 2012–13
Hamza Al-Dardour – Najran, Al-Khaleej, Al-Faisaly – 2012–13, 2014–16
Mohammad Al-Dmeiri – Al-Ittihad – 2014–15
Mussab Al-Laham – Najran – 2013–15
Suleiman Al-Salman – Al-Wehda – 2010–11
Alaa' Al-Shaqran – Hajer – 2014–15
Ibrahim Al-Zawahreh – Al-Khaleej – 2014–16
Hatem Aqel – Al-Raed – 2009–11
Khalil Bani Attiah – Al-Faisaly – 2013–15
Anas Bani Yaseen – Najran, Al-Raed – 2009–11, 2014–15
Bashar Bani Yaseen – Al-Hazem – 2008–10
Abdallah Deeb – Al-Orobah – 2013–14
Amer Deeb – Al-Faisaly – 2011–12
Basem Fathi – Al-Watani – 2008–09
Hazem Jawdat – Hajer – 2011–13
Mohammad Khamees – Al-Hazem – 2010–11
Tareq Khattab – Al-Shabab – 2014–15
Mohammad Muneer – Al-Ansar – 2011–12
Mohammad Mustafa – Al-Shoulla – 2013–14
Amer Shafi – Al-Fayha – 2018–20

Kazakhstan 
Alexander Merkel – Al-Faisaly – 2020–21

Kenya 
David Ochieng – Al-Taawoun – 2013–15

Korea Republic 

Cho Sung-hwan – Al-Hilal – 2013–14
Jang Hyun-soo – Al-Hilal – 2019–
Kim Byung-suk – Al-Nassr – 2011–12
Kim Jin-su – Al-Nassr – 2020–21
Kim Seung-gyu – Al-Shabab – 2022–
Kwak Tae-hwi – Al-Shabab, Al-Hilal – 2012–16
Lee Chun-soo – Al-Nassr – 2009–10
Lee Won-young – Al-Ettifaq – 2011–12
Lee Young-pyo – Al-Hilal – 2009–11
Park Chu-young – Al-Shabab – 2014–15
Seol Ki-hyeon – Al-Hilal – 2008–09
Song Chong-gug – Al-Shabab – 2010–11
Suk Hyun-jun – Al-Ahli – 2013–14
Yoo Byung-soo – Al-Hilal – 2011–13

Kuwait 
Fahad Al Ansari – Al-Ittihad, Al-Faisaly – 2016–19
Ahmed Al Dhefiri – Al-Qadsiah – 2016–17
Fahad Al Enezi – Al-Ittihad – 2011–12
Fahad Al Hajeri – Al-Ettifaq – 2017–18
Saif Al Hashan – Al-Shabab – 2015–17
Bader Al Mutawa – Al-Nassr – 2010–11
Musaed Neda – Al-Shabab, Al-Orobah – 2010–11, 2014–15
Faisal Zayid – Najran – 2015–16

Lebanon 
Mohamad Haidar – Al-Ittihad, Al-Fateh – 2013–14
Khodor Salame – Al-Orobah – 2014–15

Liberia 
William Jebor – Al-Nassr – 2017–18

Libya 
Tarik El Taib – Al-Hilal, Al-Shabab – 2008–10
Muaid Ellafi – Al-Shabab – 2017–18

Lithuania 
Giedrius Arlauskis – Al-Shabab – 2020–21

Luxembourg 
Gerson Rodrigues – Al-Wehda – 2022–

Madagascar 
Carolus Andriamatsinoro – Ohod, Al-Adalah, Al-Qadsiah – 2017–18, 2019–21
Faneva Andriatsima – Abha, Al-Fayha – 2019–20

Malawi 
Rayane Hamidou – Al-Ahli, Al-Tai – 2021–22

Mali 
Sédonoudé Abouta – Al-Raed – 2009–10
Yaqoub Alhassan – Al-Taawoun – 2021–
Samba Diakité – Al-Ittihad – 2014–15
Sékou Doumbia – Al-Wehda – 2012–13
Lassana Fané – Al-Shoulla, Al-Batin – 2012–15, 2016–17
Eliassou Issiaka – Al-Orobah – 2013–14
Mamadou Kondo – Al-Shoulla – 2012–14
Modibo Maïga – Al-Nassr – 2015–16
Moussa Marega – Al-Hilal – 2021–
Mamoutou N'Diaye – Ohod – 2017–18
Aboubacar Tambadou – Najran – 2015–16
Ibrahima Tandia – Al-Hazem – 2019–20, 2021–22
Adama Traoré – Al-Nahda – 2013–14
Adama Traoré – Al-Adalah – 2019–20

Mauritania 
Ismaël Diakité – Al-Khaleej – 2016–17
Souleymane Doukara – Al-Ettifaq – 2019–21

Moldova 
Henrique Luvannor – Al-Taawoun – 2021–22

Montenegro 
Bojan Božović – Al-Shoulla – 2014–15
Đorđe Đikanović – Hajer – 2014–15
Milan Mijatović – Al-Adalah – 2022–

Morocco 

Faouzi Abdelghani – Al-Ittihad – 2011–14
Zakaria Aboub – Al-Raed – 2008–09
Hicham Aboucherouane – Al-Ittihad – 2008–10
Jaouad Akaddar – Al-Raed – 2010–12
Nordin Amrabat – Al-Nassr – 2018–21
Salaheddine Aqqal – Al-Ettifaq, Al-Hazem, Al-Raed, Al-Taawoun – 2008–12
Amine Atouchi – Abha – 2019–
Aziz Ayat Aabi – Abha – 2008–09
Walid Azaro – Al-Ettifaq – 2019–22
Mourad Batna – Al-Fateh – 2020–
Achraf Bencharki – Al-Hilal – 2017–18
Abdelkarim Benhania – Al-Wehda – 2009–10
Aziz Bouhaddouz – Al-Batin – 2018–19
Mbark Boussoufa – Al-Shabab – 2018–19
Manuel da Costa – Al-Ittihad – 2018–20
Jalal Daoudi – Al-Raed – 2019–21
Karim Eddafi – Al-Hazem – 2008–09
Karim El Ahmadi – Al-Ittihad – 2018–22
Youssef El Arabi – Al-Hilal – 2011–12
Karim El Berkaoui – Al-Raed – 2020–
Mounir El Hamdaoui – Al-Taawoun – 2016–17
Moestafa El Kabir – Al-Ahli – 2014–15
Issam Erraki – Al-Wehda, Al-Raed – 2010–13, 2017–18
Fayçal Fajr – Al-Wehda – 2022–
Driss Fettouhi – Al-Hazem, Al-Ahli – 2019–21
Mohamed Fouzair – Al-Nassr, Ohod, Al-Raed – 2017–
Zakaria Hadraf – Damac – 2019–20
Abdelilah Hafidi – Al-Hazem – 2021–22
Abderrazak Hamdallah – Al-Nassr, Al-Ittihad – 2018–
Ahmed Hammoudan – Al-Raed – 2018–19
Adil Hermach – Al-Hilal – 2011–14
Mouhcine Iajour – Damac – 2019–20
Youssef Kaddioui – Al-Wehda – 2009–11
Zouhair Laaroubi – Ohod – 2018–19
Saâd Lagrou – Al-Nassr – 2017–18
Youness Mankari – Al-Ettifaq – 2009–10
Abdelali Mhamdi – Abha – 2019–22
Tarik Miri – Al-Raed – 2008–09
Munir Mohamedi – Al-Wehda – 2022–
Youness Mokhtar – Al-Nassr – 2015–16
Mohamed Nahiri – Al-Ain – 2020–21
Abdessamad Ouarrad – Najran – 2009–10
Abdessamad Rafik – Al-Wehda – 2009–10
Moha Rharsalla – Al-Hazem – 2021–22
Marwane Saâdane – Al-Fateh – 2019–
Hassan Taïr – Al-Shoulla, Al-Raed – 2012–15
Naoufel Zerhouni – Al-Hazem – 2021–22
Khalid Zouine – Abha – 2008–09

Mozambique 
Luís Miquissone – Abha – 2022–23

Netherlands 
Youssef El Jebli – Al-Faisaly, Al-Batin – 2019–22
Aschraf El Mahdioui – Al-Taawoun – 2021–
Hicham Faik – Al-Faisaly – 2020–22
Ola John – Al-Hazem – 2021–22
Adam Maher – Damac – 2022–
Mohamed Rayhi – Al-Batin – 2020–22
Dries Saddiki – Abha – 2022–
Xandro Schenk – Al-Batin – 2020–21

Niger 
Ousmane Diabaté – Al-Batin – 2017–18
Moussa Maâzou – Ohod – 2018–19
Amadou Moutari – Al-Ain, Al-Fayha – 2020–22
Yousef Omar – Al-Hazem – 2019–20, 2021–22

Nigeria 

Uche Agba – Al-Qadsiah – 2011–12
Joseph Akpala – Al-Faisaly – 2018–19
Izuchuckwu Anthony – Al-Khaleej – 2022–
Franklin Ayodele – Hajer – 2011–12
Edorisi Ekhosuehi – Al-Qadsiah – 2010–11
Emmanuel Emmanuel – Al-Fateh – 2009–10
Michael Eneramo – Al-Ettifaq – 2016–17
Ndubuisi Eze – Al-Ahli – 2008–09
Patrick Eze – Al-Qadsiah – 2016–17
Reuben Gabriel – Abha – 2019–20
Ezekiel Henty – Al-Hazem – 2021–22
Abdulshakour Hosawi – Al-Batin – 2017–18
Kennedy Igboananike – Al-Hazem – 2018–19
Odion Ighalo – Al-Shabab, Al-Hilal – 2020–
Imran Ilyas – Al-Shabab, Damac – 2019–20
Leke James – Al-Qadsiah – 2020–21
Nasigba John-Jumbo – Al-Qadsiah – 2010–12
Ahmed Musa – Al-Nassr – 2018–21
Anthony Nwakaeme – Al-Fayha – 2022–
Peter Nworah – Al-Ain – 2020–21
Obinna Obiefule – Najran – 2014–15
Godfrey Oboabona – Al-Ahli – 2017–18
Stanley Ohawuchi – Al-Qadsiah – 2017–18, 2020–21
John Ogu – Al-Adalah – 2019–20
Ifeanyi Onyilo – Al-Faisaly – 2015–16
Waheed Oseni – Al-Taawoun, Najran – 2012–14
Isaac Promise – Al-Ahli – 2014–15
Moussa Soulaimane – Najran – 2009–10

North Macedonia 
Until 2019 named Republic of Macedonia
Ezgjan Alioski – Al-Ahli – 2021–22
Zoran Baldovaliev – Najran, Al-Qadsiah – 2011–12
Ertan Demiri – Al-Taawoun – 2010–11
Ferhan Hasani – Al-Raed – 2018–19
Mensur Kurtiši – Al-Taawoun – 2010–11
Šakir Redžepi – Al-Taawoun – 2010–12
Aleksandar Trajkovski – Al-Fayha – 2021–
Darko Velkovski – Al-Ettifaq – 2022–

Norway 
Liban Abdi – Al-Ettifaq – 2017–18
Pa-Modou Kah – Al-Wehda – 2012–13
Amahl Pellegrino – Damac – 2020–21
Gustav Wikheim – Al-Fateh – 2019–22

Oman 

Ismail Al-Ajmi – Al-Faisaly – 2012–13
Eid Al-Farsi – Al-Raed – 2015–16
Ali Al-Habsi – Al-Hilal – 2017–19
Hussain Al-Hadhri – Al-Raed – 2013–14
Amad Al-Hosni – Al-Ahli, Al-Nassr – 2010–14
Mohsin Al-Khaldi – Ohod – 2017–18
Badar Al-Maimani – Al-Ettifaq – 2009–10
Abdul Salam Al-Mukhaini – Al-Raed – 2011–13
Abdul Aziz Al-Muqbali – Al-Taawoun – 2012–13
Said Al-Shoon – Al-Qadsiah – 2009–10
Khalifa Ayil – Al-Ettifaq, Al-Raed – 2009–11
Ahmed Hadid – Al-Ittihad – 2008–11
Ahmed Mubarak Kano – Al-Ahli, Al-Fateh, Al-Ettifaq – 2009–11, 2012–13
Talal Khalfan – Najran – 2008–09
Hassan Mudhafar – Al-Ettifaq – 2010–12
Hassan Rabia – Al-Nassr – 2008–09
Saad Suhail – Al-Nassr – 2017–18

Palestine 
Abdelatif Bahdari – Hajer – 2011–13
Imad Khalili – Al-Shabab – 2013–14
Ashraf Nu'man – Al-Faisaly, Hajer – 2014–16

Panama 
José Luis Garcés – Al-Ettifaq – 2009–10

Paraguay 
Víctor Ayala – Al-Nassr – 2016–17
Nelson Figueredo – Al-Qadsiah – 2009–10
Kaku – Al-Taawoun – 2020–

Peru 
André Carrillo – Al-Hilal – 2018–
Juan Cominges – Al-Qadsiah – 2009–11
Christian Cueva – Al-Fateh – 2020–23
Christofer Gonzáles – Al-Adalah – 2022–
Christian Ramos – Al-Nassr – 2018–19
Alex Valera – Al-Fateh – 2022–23

Poland 

Łukasz Gikiewicz – Al-Wehda – 2015–16
Michał Janota – Al-Fateh – 2019–20
Grzegorz Krychowiak – Al-Shabab – 2022–
Adrian Mierzejewski – Al-Nassr – 2014–16
Łukasz Szukała – Al-Ittihad – 2014–15

Portugal 
Pedro Amaral – Al-Khaleej – 2022–
André André – Al-Ittihad – 2021–22
Arsénio – Al-Fayha – 2019–20
Nuno Assis – Al-Ittihad – 2010–11
Eder – Al-Raed – 2021–22
Pedro Eugénio – Al-Adalah – 2022–
Hernâni Fortes – Al-Wehda – 2020–21
Paulo Jorge – Al-Ittihad – 2010–12
Ricardo Machado – Al-Taawoun – 2015–20
Fábio Martins – Al-Shabab, Al-Khaleej – 2020–21, 2022–
André Pinto – Al-Fateh – 2019–20
Tiago Rodrigues – Al-Hazem – 2021–22
Diogo Salomão – Al-Hazem – 2018–19
Ukra – Al-Fateh – 2016–17
Cristiano Ronaldo - Al-Nassr - 2022–

Puerto Rico 
Héctor Ramos – Al-Qadsiah – 2015–16

Qatar 
Talal Al-Bloushi – Al-Shabab – 2008–09

Romania 

Mircea Axente – Al-Faisaly – 2016–18
Mihai Bordeianu – Al-Qadsiah – 2020–21
Constantin Budescu – Al-Shabab, Damac – 2018–19, 2020–21
Răzvan Cociș – Al-Nassr – 2010–11
Cristian Dănălache – Al-Ettifaq – 2009–10
Valerică Găman – Al-Shabab – 2018–19
Nicolae Grigore – Al-Ettifaq – 2013–14
Silviu Lung Jr. – Al-Raed – 2022–
Alexandru Mitriță – Al-Ahli, Al-Raed – 2020–21, 2022–
Ovidiu Petre – Al-Nassr – 2010–11
Mihai Pintilii – Al-Hilal – 2014–15
Adrian Popa – Al-Taawoun – 2017–18
Mirel Rădoi – Al-Hilal – 2008–11
Lucian Sânmărtean – Al-Ittihad, Al-Taawoun – 2014–17
Nicolae Stanciu – Al-Ahli – 2018–19
Dorel Stoica – Al-Ettifaq – 2009–10

São Tomé and Príncipe 
Luís Leal – Al-Ahli, Al-Fateh – 2013–14, 2016–17

Senegal 
Aliou Cissé – Al-Adalah – 2019–20
Kemekho Cissokho – Al-Fateh – 2011–14
Mbaye Diagne – Al-Shabab – 2014–15
Albaye Papa Diop – Al-Faisaly – 2010–11
Makhete Diop – Al-Watani, Al-Shabab – 2008–09, 2019–21
Adama François – Hajer, Al-Khaleej – 2015–17
Ibrahima Gueye – Al-Ahli – 2008–09
Mansour Gueye – Hajer – 2014–15
Hamad Ji – Al-Hazem, Najran – 2008–11
Macoumba Kandji – Al-Faisaly – 2014–15
Diakite Lamine – Al-Ansar – 2011–12
Sy Ass Mandaw – Al-Adalah – 2019–20
Malick Mané – Najran – 2015–16
Kader Mangane – Al-Hilal – 2012–13
Alfred N'Diaye – Al-Shabab – 2019–22
Daouda N'Diaye – Al-Wehda – 2008–09
Alassane Ndao – Al-Ahli – 2021–22
Badou Ndiaye – Al-Ain – 2020–21
M'Baye Niang – Al-Ahli – 2020–21
Mohamed Roubize – Al-Hazem – 2008–11
Abdoulaye Sané – Al-Taawoun – 2020–21
Babacar Sarr – Damac – 2019–20
Assane Sy – Al-Watani – 2008–09
Papa Waigo – Al-Ettifaq, Al-Raed – 2013–15

Serbia 

Danijel Aleksić – Al-Ahli – 2019–20
Dragan Ćeran – Hajer – 2015–16
Dušan Đokić – Najran – 2011–12
Ljubomir Fejsa – Al-Ahli – 2020–22
Nenad Injac – Al-Ansar – 2011–12
Saša Jovanović – Al-Fateh – 2018–19, 2020–21
Nikica Košutić – Al-Hazem – 2010–11
Uroš Matić – Abha – 2021–
Nemanja Miletić – Al-Raed – 2020–21
Nemanja Nikolić – Al-Raed – 2020–21
Nemanja Obrić – Al-Hazem – 2010–11
Milan Pavkov – Al-Fayha – 2022–
Aleksandar Pešić – Al-Ittihad – 2018–19
Nikola Petković – Al-Ahli – 2010–11
Aleksandar Prijović – Al-Ittihad – 2018–21
Marko Stanojević – Al-Fateh – 2015–16
Luka Stojanović – Al-Hazem – 2021–22
Vladimir Stojković – Al-Fayha – 2021–
Nemanja Tubić – Hajer – 2015–16
Despot Višković – Al-Ansar – 2011–12
Uroš Vitas – Al-Qadsiah – 2020–21

Sierra Leone 
Alhaji Kamara – Al-Taawoun – 2017–18
David Simbo – Najran – 2015–16

Slovakia 
Boris Godál – Al-Adalah – 2022–
Filip Kiss – Al-Ettifaq – 2017–22

Slovenia 
Dejan Rusič – Al-Taawoun – 2010–11, 2012–13
David Tijanić – Al-Adalah – 2022–

Spain 
Alexis – Al-Ahli – 2018–19
Alberto Botía – Al-Hilal, Al-Wehda – 2018–21, 2022–
Juanmi Callejón – Al-Ettifaq – 2016–18
Álvaro González – Al-Nassr – 2022–
Iago Herrerín – Al-Raed – 2021–22
José Jurado – Al-Ahli – 2018–19
Álvaro Medrán – Al-Taawoun – 2021–
Santi Mina – Al-Shabab – 2022–
Nono – Damac – 2021–
Dani Quintana – Al-Ahli – 2014–15
Víctor Ruiz – Al-Fayha – 2022–
Jonathan Soriano – Al-Hilal – 2018–19
Dani Suárez – Abha – 2021–2022
Cristian Tello – Al-Fateh – 2022–
Fran Vélez – Al-Fateh – 2022–

Sudan 
Mohammed Al-Dhaw – Ohod, Al-Fateh – 2017–21
Mohammed Hassan Babo – Damac – 2019–20
Mohamed Ahmed Bashir – Al-Wehda – 2012–13

Suriname 
Mitchell te Vrede – Al-Fateh, Abha – 2019–22

Sweden 

Marcus Antonsson – Al-Adalah – 2022–
Nabil Bahoui – Al-Ahli – 2015–16
Nahir Besara – Al-Fayha – 2018–19
Robin Quaison – Al-Ettifaq – 2021–
Jacob Rinne – Al-Fateh – 2022–
Carlos Strandberg – Al-Hazem, Abha – 2019–22
Christian Wilhelmsson – Al-Hilal – 2008–12

Switzerland 
Martin Angha – Al-Adalah – 2022–23
Cephas Malele – Al-Tai – 2021–22

Syria 

Jehad Al Baour – Al-Wehda – 2015–17
Abdelrazaq Al Hussain – Al-Taawoun – 2011–12
Jehad Al Hussain – Najran, Al-Taawoun, Al-Raed – 2011–13, 2014–21
Mahmoud Al Mawas – Al-Faisaly – 2015–16
Omar Al Somah – Al-Ahli – 2014–22
Wael Ayan – Al-Faisaly, Najran – 2010–13
Ahmad Deeb – Al-Fateh – 2014–15
Tamer Haj Mohamad – Ohod – 2018–19
Mohannad Ibrahim – Al-Ettifaq – 2008–09
Mohammad Istanbuli – Al-Ansar – 2011–12
Youssef Kalfa – Al-Hazem, Al-Qadsiah – 2018–19
Omar Kharbin – Al-Hilal – 2016–21
Raja Rafe – Al-Wehda – 2008–09

Timor-Leste 
Murilo de Almeida – Al-Ettifaq – 2013–14

Togo 
Christophe Grondin – Al-Faisaly – 2012–13
Sadat Ouro-Akoriko – Al-Faisaly, Al-Khaleej – 2015–16

Trinidad and Tobago 
Khaleem Hyland – Al-Faisaly, Al-Batin – 2017–21

Tunisia 

Amine Abbes – Al-Nahda – 2013–14
Ghazi Abderrazzak – Ohod – 2018–19
Ahmed Akaïchi – Al-Ittihad, Al-Ettifaq – 2016–19
Amir Akrout – Al-Wehda – 2008–09
Karim Aouadhi – Abha – 2019–21
Ghazi Ayadi – Damac – 2019–20
Anice Badri – Al-Ittihad – 2019–20
Rami Bedoui – Al-Fayha – 2018–19
Aymen Belaïd – Ohod – 2018–19
Mohamed Amine Ben Amor – Al-Ahli – 2017–18
Farouk Ben Mustapha – Al-Shabab – 2017–20
Radhouane Ben Ouanes – Al-Ansar – 2011–12
Ramzi Ben Younès – Al-Fateh – 2009–11
Fakhreddine Ben Youssef – Al-Ettifaq – 2017–19
Naïm Berrabet – Al-Fateh – 2009–10
Saad Bguir – Abha – 2019–
Moïne Chaâbani – Al-Qadsiah – 2010–11
Firas Chaouat – Abha – 2019–20
Lamjed Chehoudi – Al-Fateh – 2017–18
Amine Chermiti – Al-Ittihad, Al-Fayha – 2009–10, 2018–19
Oussama Darragi – Al-Raed – 2015–16
Zouheir Dhaouadi – Al-Wehda – 2015–16
Hichem Essifi – Ohod – 2017–18
Youssef Fouzai – Al-Adalah – 2019–20
Saïf Ghezal – Al-Ahli – 2009–10
Oussama Haddadi – Al-Ettifaq – 2019–20
Bilel Ifa – Abha – 2021–22
Issam Jebali – Al-Wehda – 2018–19
Ammar Jemal – Al-Fateh – 2013–14
Haythem Jouini – Al-Ain – 2020–21
Aymen Mathlouthi – Al-Batin, Al-Adalah – 2017–18, 2019–20
Mohammad Mothnani – Al-Qadsiah – 2017–18
Hamdi Nagguez – Al-Ahli – 2021–22
Abdelkader Oueslati – Al-Fateh – 2016–20
Zied Ounalli – Al-Batin – 2018–19
Bilel Sabri – Al-Wehda – 2008–09
Bilel Saidani – Damac – 2019–21
Ferjani Sassi – Al-Nassr – 2017–18
Naïm Sliti – Al-Ettifaq – 2019–
Mejdi Traoui – Al-Wehda – 2008–09
Mohamed Yacoubi – Al-Fateh – 2017–18

Turkey 
Emre Çolak – Al-Wehda – 2018–20
Berat Özdemir – Al-Ettifaq – 2022–

Ukraine 
Maksym Koval – Al-Fateh – 2018–22

United Arab Emirates 
Omar Abdulrahman – Al-Hilal – 2018–19
Sebastián Tagliabúe – Al-Ettifaq, Al-Shabab – 2010–13

United States 
Jeremiah White – Al-Ettifaq – 2009–10

Uruguay 
Mauricio Affonso – Al-Shabab – 2015–16
Matías Aguirregaray – Al-Fateh – 2018–20
Brahian Alemán – Al-Ettifaq – 2018–19
Ramón Arias – Al-Ettifaq – 2018–19
Diego Arismendi – Al-Shabab – 2015–16
Matías Britos – Al-Hilal – 2017–18
Martín Campaña – Al-Batin – 2020–
Fabián Estoyanoff – Al-Nassr – 2014–15
Adolfo Lima – Al-Wehda – 2015–17
Renzo López – Al-Batin – 2022–
Nicolás Milesi – Al-Hilal – 2016–18
Juan Olivera – Al-Shabab – 2010–11
Sebastián Píriz – Al-Shabab – 2016–17
Jonathan Rodríguez – Al-Nassr – 2021–22
Juan Rodríguez – Al-Ittihad – 2013–14

Uzbekistan 

Server Djeparov – Al-Shabab – 2011–13
Jaloliddin Masharipov – Al-Nassr – 2021–
Shavkat Mullajanov – Al-Nassr – 2012–13
Ignatiy Nesterov – Ohod – 2018–19

Venezuela 
Juan Falcón – Al-Fateh – 2015–16
Juanpi – Al-Ain – 2020–21
Adrián Martínez – Al-Tai – 2022–
Rómulo Otero – Al-Wehda – 2018–19
Gelmin Rivas – Al-Ittihad, Al-Hilal – 2015–16, 2017–19

Zambia 
Francis Kasonde – Al-Hazem – 2010–11
Saith Sakala – Al-Fateh – 2017–18

Zimbabwe 
Knowledge Musona – Al-Tai – 2021–
Tendai Ndoro – Al-Faisaly – 2017–18

Notes

References

FootballDatabase
SLstat.com
Foreign players in 2008–09
Soccerway
128 Foreign players from 42 nations appear in SPL for the 2018–19 season

 
Saudi Arabia
Foreign
Association football player non-biographical articles